The clandestine dart or w-marked cutworm (Spaelotis clandestina) is a moth of the family Noctuidae. It is found from coast to coast across Canada to southern Alaska, and in the eastern United States from Maine to western North Carolina, west to northern Ohio to North Dakota, South Dakota, Nebraska, and down the Rocky Mountains from Montana to southern Arizona.

The wingspan is about 38 mm. Adults are on wing from May to October.

The larvae are a pest on a variety of trees, shrubs, and herbaceous plants, including Vaccinium, Acer, Pinus, Fabaceae, Brassica oleracea, Zea mays, Malus and Fragaria.

External links
Bug Guide
The Noctuinae (Lepidoptera: Noctuidae) of Great Smoky Mountains National Park, U.S.A.
Images

Noctuinae
Moths of North America